The 1918 Oregon Webfoots football team represented the University of Oregon in the Pacific Coast Conference (PCC) during the 1918 college football season. In their first season under head coach Charles A. Huntington, the Webfoots compiled a 4–2 record (2–1 against PCC opponents), finished in second place in the PCC, and outscored their opponents, 81 to 35. The team played its home games at Kincaid Field in Eugene, Oregon.

Schedule

References

Oregon
Oregon Ducks football seasons
Oregon Ducks football